Them Dirty Blues is an album by the Cannonball Adderley Quintet, recorded in 1960.

Reception
The AllMusic review by Al Campbell awarded the album 4 stars, stating: "Recorded in early 1960, Them Dirty Blues contains two classic jazz compositions." The Penguin Guide to Jazz awarded the album 3⅓ stars, noting: "Them Dirty Blues debuts Nat's 'Work Song' in the band's book, as well as Bobby Timmons's 'Dat Dere'."

The album includes two other tunes which have become jazz standards: "Del Sasser" and "Jeannine".

Track listing 
(2000 Capitol/Blue Note CD re-issue)

 "Work Song" (Nat Adderley) – 5:05
 "Jeannine" (Duke Pearson) – 7:15
 "Easy Living" (Ralph Rainger, Leo Robin) – 4:20
 "Them Dirty Blues" (Julian "Cannonball" Adderley) – 7:10
 "Dat Dere" (Bobby Timmons) – 5:28
 "Del Sasser" (Sam Jones) – 4:40
 "Soon" (George Gershwin, Ira Gershwin) – 5:34
 "Work Song" (Alternate Version) – 5:49
 "Dat Dere" (Alternate Take) – 5:28

Personnel 
Julian "Cannonball" Adderley – alto sax
Nat Adderley – cornet
Bobby Timmons (tracks 5–9) – piano
Barry Harris (tracks 1–4) – piano
Sam Jones – bass
Louis Hayes – drums

References 

Cannonball Adderley albums
Capitol Records albums
1960 albums
Albums produced by Orrin Keepnews